Gameplay is the specific way in which players interact with a game, and in particular with video games. Gameplay is the pattern defined through the game rules, connection between player and the game, challenges and overcoming them, plot and player's connection with it. Video game gameplay is distinct from graphics and audio elements. In card games, the equivalent term is play.

Overview

Arising alongside video game development in the 1980s, the term gameplay was used solely within the context of video games, though now its popularity has begun to see use in the description of other, more traditional, game forms. Generally, gameplay is considered the overall experience of playing a video game, excluding factors like graphics and sound. Game mechanics, on the other hand, is the sets of rules in a game that are intended to produce an enjoyable gaming experience. Academic discussions tend to favor game mechanics specifically to avoid gameplay since the latter is too vague. The word is sometimes misapplied to card games where, however, the usual term is "play" and refers to the way the cards are played out in accordance with the rules (as opposed to other aspects such as dealing or bidding).

Types

There are three components to gameplay: "Manipulation rules", defining what the player can do in the game, "Goal Rules", defining the goal of the game, and "Metarules", defining how a game can be tuned or modified.  In video games gameplay can be divided into several types. For example, cooperative gameplay involves two or more players playing on a team. Another example is twitch gameplay which is based around testing a player's reaction times and precision, maybe in rhythm games or first-person shooters.  Various gameplay types are listed below.

 Asymmetric video game
 Cooperative video game
 Emergent gameplay
 Nonlinear gameplay

Ambiguity in definition
The term gameplay can be quite ambiguous to define; thus, it has been differently defined by different authors.

For instance:

 "A series of interesting choices." -Sid Meier
 "The structures of player interaction with the game system and with other players in the game."
 "One or more causally linked series of challenges in a simulated environment."
 "A good game is one that you can win by doing the unexpected and making it work."
 "The experience of gameplay is one of interacting with a game design in the performance of cognitive tasks, with a variety of emotions arising from or associated with different elements of motivation, task performance and completion."
 "Gameplay here is seen as the interactive gaming process of the player with the game."

Playability

Playability is the ease by which the game can be played or the quantity or duration that a game can be played and is a common measure of the quality of gameplay. Playability evaluative methods target games to improve design while player experience evaluative methods target players to improve gaming."  This is not to be confused with the ability to control (or play) characters in multi-character games such as role playing games or fighting games, or factions in real-time strategy games.

Playability is defined as a set of properties that describe the Player Experience using a specific game system whose main objective is to provide enjoyment and entertainment by being credible and satisfying when the player plays alone or in the company of others. Playability is characterized by different attributes and properties to measure the video game player experience. 
 Satisfaction: the degree of gratification or pleasure of the player for completing a video game or some aspect like mechanism, graphics, user interface, story, etc. Satisfaction is a highly subjective attribute that provokes a difficult measuring due to player preferences and pleasures influencing the satisfaction for specific game elements: characters, virtual world, challenges, and so on.
 Learning:  the facility to understand and dominate the game system and mechanics (objectives, rules, how to interact with the video game, etc.). The Desktop Systems try to minimize the learning effort, but gamers can use the learning curve in video games according to the game's nature. For example, on the one hand, gamers can demand great initial abilities before playing, or training them harshly in the first phases of the game, to help players understand and dominate all the game rules and resources and use them from the beginning. On the other hand, players can learn step by step in a guided way when they need some ability in the video game.
 Efficiency: the necessary time and resources to offer fun and entertainment to players while achieving the different game objectives and reaching the final goal. An efficient video game can catch the player's attention immediately and provoke him to continue playing to the end of the game. Efficiency can be analyzed as the correct use of the challenge through the game, the correct structuring of the objectives or the best adaptation of the control to the actions in the game.
 Immersion: the capacity to believe in the video game contents and integrate the player in the virtual game world. The immersion provokes that the player looks involved in the virtual world, becoming part of this and interacting with it because the user perceives the virtual world represented by the video game, with its laws and rules that characterize it. A video game has a good immersion level when it has equilibrium between the proposed challenges and the necessary player abilities to overcome them.
 Motivation: the characteristics that provoke the player to realize concrete actions and persist in them until their culmination. To obtain a high degree of motivation, the game should have resources to ensure the player's perseverance in the performed actions to overcome the game challenges. This means providing different factors to ensure positive reception in the interpretation of the game process, keeping the player focused on the proposed challenges, showing the relevance of the objectives to reach, and rewards for challenges to keep the player confident and motivated. The player should feel satisfied after receiving the reward or after completing the challenge.  
 Emotion: the involuntary impulse, originated in response to the stimulus of the video game and induces feelings or unleashes automatic reactions and conducts. The use of emotions in video games help to cultivate the best player experience and leads players to different emotional states: happiness, fear, intrigue, curiosity, sadness... using the game challenges, story, aesthetic, appearance, or the music compositions that are capable of affecting the player.
 Socialization: the degree of the game attributes, elements and resources that promote the social factor of the game experience in a group. This kind of experience provokes appreciating the video game differently, thanks to the relations established with other players or with other characters of the game that help the player resolve the game challenges in a collaborative, competitive or cooperative way. The game socialization allows players to have a totally different game experience when they play with other persons and promote new social relationships thanks to their interaction.  In addition to this, socialization also is present in how the social connections that players have are projected with the group in the characters of the video game and the context in which the game is realized. For example, choosing the player to be connected or to share something, interacting, obtaining information, asking for help, or negotiating for some items, and how our influence with the other character is positive or negative to achieve the game objectives. To promote the social factor, it is advisable to develop new shared challenges that help players to integrate and being satisfied with the new game rules and objectives, creating a set of collective emotions where players (or characters) encourage and motivate themselves to overcome the collective challenges.

Playability's facets
The playability analysis is a very complex process due to the different point of view to analyze the different part of video game architecture. Each facet allows us to identify the different playability's attributes and properties affected by the different elements of video game architecture. The playability's facets are:
 Intrinsic Playability: the playability based on the video game's nature and how the player shows it. It is strongly related to the gameplay and game mechanics. We can analyze the video game design implementation in this facet, especially video game rules, goals, objectives, rhythm, and other design mechanics.
 Mechanical Playability: the video game quality as a software system. It is related to the Game Engine, with special emphasis, for example, in the fluency of the movie scenes, correct lights, shadows and rendering, sound and music, graphics motions, character personality implementation and communication systems in a multiplayer video game.
 Interactive Playability: player interaction and video game user interface development, for example, interaction dialogue and game controls. This playability is easily visible in the Game Interface.
 Artistic Playability: the quality of the video game arts and aesthetics in the game elements: visual graphics, sound effects, music and melodies, storyline and storytelling and how these elements are shown in the video game.
 Intrapersonal Playability or Personal Playability: the individual vision, perception, and feelings that the video game produces in each player when they play the game. It has a highly subjective value.
 Interpersonal Playability or Social Playability: the group consciousness and different user perceptions when the player plays with other players in a competitive, cooperative or collaborative way.

Finally, a video game's "global" playability will be deduced through each attribute value in the different playability's facets. It is crucial to improve the playability in the different facets to guarantee the best player experience when the player plays the video game.

See also
 Game development and Game design
 Game mechanics
 Interaction design
 Play (activity)
 Time-keeping systems in games
 Video game genres

Footnotes

References

Further reading on playability

 Desurvire, H., Caplan, M., & Toth, J. A. (2004). Using heuristics to evaluate the playability of games. CHI '04 extended abstracts on Human factors in computing systems, Vienna, Austria. 
 Fabricatore, C., Nussbaum, M., & Rosas, R. (2002). Playability in video games: a qualitative design model. Human-Computer Interaction, 17(4), 311–368. 
 Jegers, K. (2008). Investigating the Applicability of Usability and Playability Heuristics for Evaluation of Pervasive Games. Internet and Web Applications and Services, 2008. ICIW '08.
 Korhonen, H., & Koivisto, E. M. I. (2006). Playability heuristics for mobile games. In Proceedings of the 8th Conference on Human-Computer interaction with Mobile Devices and Services (Helsinki, Finland, September 12–15, 2006). MobileHCI '06, vol. 159. ACM, New York, NY, 9-16. doi: 10.1145/1152215.1152218
 Korhonen H., Koivisto E.M.I. (2007). Playability Heuristics for Mobile Multi-player Games. In proceedings of the 2nd International Conference on Digital Interactive Media in Entertainment and Arts, DIMEA 2007, ACM Press (2007), pp. 28–35. Perth, Australia. doi: 10.1145/1306813.1306828
 Nacke, L. (2009). From Playability to a Hierarchical Game Usability Model. In Proceedings of the 2009 Conference on Future Play on @ GDC Canada (Vancouver, British Columbia, Canada, May 12–13, 2009). FuturePlay '09. ACM, New York, NY, 11–12. doi: 10.1145/1639601.1639609
 Nacke, L. E., Drachen, A., Kuikkaniemi, K., Niesenhaus, J., Korhonen, H. J., Hoogen, W. M. v. d., et al. (2009). Playability and Player Experience Research. Proceedings of DiGRA 2009: Breaking New Ground: Innovation in Games, Play, Practice and Theory, London, UK. (online slides)
 Järvinen, A., Heliö, S. and Mäyrä, F. Communication and Community in Digital Entertainment Services. Prestudy Research Report, Hypermedia Laboratory, University of Tampere, Tampere, 2002.
 González Sánchez, J. L., Zea, N. P., & Gutiérrez, F. L. (2009). From Usability to Playability: Introduction to Player-Centred Video Game Development Process. Proceedings of First International Conference, HCD 2009 (Held as Part of HCI International), San Diego, CA, USA. doi: 10.1007/978-3-642-02806-9_9
 González Sánchez, J. L., Zea, N. P., & Gutiérrez, F. L. (2009). Playability: How to Identify the Player Experience in a Video Game. Proceedings of INTERACT 2009: 12th IFIP TC 13 International Conference, Uppsala, Sweden, August 24–28, 2009. doi: 10.1007/978-3-642-03655-2_39
 González Sánchez, J. L., Montero, F., Padilla Zea, N., Gutiérrez, F. L. "Playability as Extension of Quality in Use in Video Games". Proceedings of 2nd International Workshop on the Interplay between Usability Evaluation and Software Development (I-USED), paper number 6.Uppsala, Sweden, 24 August (2009)
 Phillips, Hubert (1957), ed. Culbertson's Card Games Complete. Watford: Arco.

 
Game design
Video game terminology